Brian Mahoney (born December 17, 1948) is an American retired college basketball coach and former professional player.  He was head coach of the St. John's Red Storm team from 1992 to 1996, as well as the Manhattan Jaspers from 1978 to 1981.

Mahoney played collegiately at Manhattan College. A 6'3", 175-pound shooting guard, he was drafted in 1971 by the Cleveland Cavaliers in the fifth round of that year's NBA draft; however, he played instead in the rival American Basketball Association as a member of the New York Nets (now the NBA's Brooklyn team) for only 19 games in the 1972–73 season. That was the only time he played professionally. After that he went into coaching.

Head coaching record

References

1948 births
Living people
American men's basketball coaches
American men's basketball players
Basketball coaches from New York (state)
Basketball players from New York (state)
Cleveland Cavaliers draft picks
Manhattan Jaspers basketball coaches
Manhattan Jaspers basketball players
New York Nets players
People from Rockville Centre, New York
Shooting guards
Sportspeople from Nassau County, New York
St. John's Red Storm men's basketball coaches